Miller Park is a public park in Bloomington, Illinois, United States. It is in the southwest part of the city, on a large block south of Wood Street and east of Morris Avenue.

The park features a pavilion, an artificial lake, a zoo, softball fields, two war memorials, and a preserved steam locomotive, its tender (rail) and a caboose from the Nickel Plate Road which formerly served the area. The park also includes a mini golf course, sand volleyball courts and a playground.

During the warm weather of summer an outdoor theater provides productions for local people. On July 4 the park hosts a fireworks display which is launched over the lake.

Monkey Island

Miller Park was also once home to what the locals called "Monkey Island" during the 1960s. In the middle of man-made Miller Park Lake, there stood a platform with the metal dome that once belonged to McLean County Courthouse, on which they had a live monkey exhibit, designed by Grover Kathoffer. Though the exhibit has long been gone, many of the local residents remember the "Monkey Island" that once was.

See also
 List of historical sites related to the Illinois labor movement#Railroad Workers' Monument — description of the railroad monument and train

References

External links

Zoo website
Voters backed establishment of Miller Park in 1887 - Pantagraph (Bloomington, Illinois newspaper)
 Miller Park Collection, McLean County Museum of History

Bloomington, Illinois
Parks in Illinois
Protected areas of McLean County, Illinois
Tourist attractions in Bloomington–Normal